Dar Sangre, founded in 2004, is a metal band from Buenos Aires, Argentina.

History 
Dar Sangre was founded in 2004 when musicians of many underground hardcore bands met together. In 2005 the group released the first Demo called “Primeros Auxilios” with 9 tracks. The band got signed by Argentine independent label Immune Records. In 2008 the band recorded the debut album “Un Corazón Por Cada Ciudad”. Drums were recorded by Martin Carrizo (a former musician of A.N.I.M.A.L.) and all other productions were done by Javier Casas at Infire Studios.

After the band was signed to Vegan Records, a Buenos Aires based independent label, Dar Sangre released the following album entitled “Imperios Por Derrumbar” at Unison Studios and mastered by Danish producers Tue Madsen and Jacob Olsen at Ant Farm Studio in Denmark. Dar Sangre released a music video of their song “Regreso”.

Dar Sangre shared stage with successful acts of the hardcore scene like Throwdown, It Dies Today, Terror, Silverstein, Hatebreed, Comeback Kid, Job for a cowboy, Strife and As I Lay Dying. On March 4, 2012 the band start “Imperios Por Derrumbar Tour”.

Musical style 
Dar Sangre plays modern metalcore which is influenced by hardcore punk, and melodic death metal bands like In Flames and Dark Tranquility. Lyrical themes are relationships, inner struggles and poetry. The lyrics are all written by the band in Spanish language.

Members 
 Current members
 Matias Espinosa - lead vocals
 Juanchy Badessich - guitar
 Federico Dimarco - guitar
 Ivan Resnik - bass
 Pedro Badessich - drums

 Former members
 Jonatan Flores - lead vocals
 Sergio Leccese - Bass

Discography 
 Primeros Auxilios (EP, self-released, 2004)
 El pais de las lagrimas (Ep, self-released, 2006) 
 Un Corazón Por Cada Ciudad (2007, Immune Records)
 Imperios Por Derrumbar (2011, Vegan Records)

Videography 
 "Regreso" (2011)
 "Cada herida" (2015)

External links 
 Artist-Rooster of Vegan Records
 Dar Sangre at MySpace
 Dar Sangre at Facebook

References 

Metalcore musical groups
Musical groups established in 2004